Keep Smiling is a 1938 British comedy film directed by Monty Banks and starring Gracie Fields, Roger Livesey and Mary Maguire. The film follows a group of performers who club together to buy a bus and travel around the country doing shows after they are cheated out of money by an ex-manager.

Plot

Cast
 Gracie Fields as Gracie Gray
 Roger Livesey as Bert Wattle
 Mary Maguire as Avis Maguire
 Peter Coke as Rene Sigani
 Jack Donohue as Denis Wilson
 Hay Petrie as Jack
 Mike Johnson as Charlie
 Eddie Gray as Silvo
 Tommy Fields as The Three Bolas
 Gladys Dehl as The Three Bolas
 Nino Rossini as The Three Bolas
 Edward Rigby as Silas Gray
 Joe Mott as Bill Sneed
 Philip Leaver as De Courcy
 Gus McNaughton as Eddie Perkins
 Paula Rae Wright (Paula Raymond age 14) as Bettina Bowman
 Carol Adams as Dancer  
 Joss Ambler as Max  
 Monty Banks as Auditioner  
 Hal Gordon 
 Wilfrid Hyde-White as Assistant hotel clerk 
 Eliot Makeham as Printer
 Julian Vedey as Hotel clerk

Production
It was the second film made by Fields under her contract with 20th Century Fox. It was made at Pinewood Studios with sets designed by the art director Oscar Friedrich Werndorff. It was retitled Smiling Along to avoid confusion with another film with the same name, released by Fox in America the same year, and starring Jane Withers.

References

Bibliography
 Low, Rachael. Filmmaking in 1930s Britain. George Allen & Unwin, 1985.
 Wood, Linda. British Films, 1927-1939. British Film Institute, 1986.

External links
 

1938 films
1930s English-language films
1938 comedy films
British comedy films
Films directed by Monty Banks
Films shot at Pinewood Studios
20th Century Fox films
Films set in England
British black-and-white films
1930s British films